Beulah Halt railway station served the village of Little Newcastle, Pembrokeshire, Wales, from 1928 to 1937 on the North Pembrokeshire and Fishguard Railway.

History 
The station opened on 24 September 1928 by the Great Western Railway. It was situated closer to Puncheston village than the original station was. Like , it only had 85-90 passengers a week, thus it closed on 25 October 1937.

References

External links 

Disused railway stations in Pembrokeshire
Former Great Western Railway stations
Railway stations in Great Britain opened in 1928
Railway stations in Great Britain closed in 1937
1928 establishments in Wales
1937 disestablishments in Wales
Puncheston